The Dâmbovicioara is a left tributary of the river Dâmbovița in Romania. Its source is in the Piatra Craiului Mountains. It flows into the Dâmbovița in Podu Dâmboviței. Upstream from its confluence with the Valea cu Apă it is also called Valea Seacă a Pietrelor, and between the confluences with the Valea cu Apă and Valea Muierii it is also called Brusturet.

Tributaries
The following rivers are tributaries to the river Dâmbovicioara (from source to mouth):

Left: Padina Dâncioarei
Right: Vâlcelul Găinii, Cheia de sub Grind, Valea Căpățânelor, Valea Lespezilor, Valea lui Stinghie, Valea cu Apă, Valea Muierii, Valea Peșterii, Valea Popii

References

Rivers of Romania
Rivers of Argeș County